Tasneem Aslam was a Pakistani career diplomat who formerly served as the  spokesperson of Ministry of Foreign Affairs.

Career 
After joining the Foreign Service of Pakistan in 1984, she served in missions in New Delhi, The Hague and Paris before serving as ambassador to Italy between 2007-2010 and to the Kingdom of Morocco in 2012. She served as the Additional Foreign Secretary for European Affairs from August 2013 till December 2013.

Aslam's alma maters include the University of the Punjab, where she received a Master in Business Administration, and The Fletcher School of Law and Diplomacy at Tufts University, where she was awarded a master's degree in International Relations.

In an article examining the progress of female diplomats, Pakistan Today stated that Aslem is the only woman from Azad Kashmir. She was the first woman appointed by the ministry as its spokesperson (in 2005). She served as director of the Foreign Secretary’s Office; director Americas; director-general at the United Nations division and the Organisation of Islamic Cooperation.

She retired form the service in 2017.

External links
 Pakistan appoints Tasnim Aslam as new Foreign Ministry spokesperson

References

Ambassadors of Pakistan to Italy
Ambassadors of Pakistan to Morocco
Living people
University of the Punjab people
The Fletcher School at Tufts University alumni
Pakistani women ambassadors
Year of birth missing (living people)